This is a list of the National Register of Historic Places listings in Liberty County, Georgia.

It is intended to be a complete list of the properties on the National Register of Historic Places in Liberty County, Georgia, United States.  The locations of National Register properties for which the latitude and longitude coordinates are included below, may be seen in a Google map.

There are 12 properties listed on the National Register in the county.

Current listings

|}

References

Liberty
Liberty County, Georgia